William Godfrey Molyneux Sarel (15 December 1875 – 5 April 1950) was an English British Army officer and cricketer.

Career
Sarel was born in Dover, and was commissioned in the 3rd (Militia) Battalion of the Queen's (Royal West Surrey Regiment). He saw active service with the battalion in the Second Boer War in South Africa 1899–1900. While in South Africa he transferred to the regular army as a second-lieutenant in the Northumberland Fusilers on 28 August 1901. Following the end of the war in June 1902, Sarel returned to the United Kingdom on the SS Orotava which arrived at Southampton in early September.

He died in Whitechapel, London.

Cricket
Sarel was active as cricketer from 1904 to 1921 and played for various first-class teams. He appeared in 35 first-class matches as a righthanded batsman who bowled off breaks. He scored 1,313 runs with a highest score of 103 and took three wickets with a best performance of one for 1.

Notes

1875 births
1950 deaths
English cricketers
Kent cricketers
Surrey cricketers
Sussex cricketers
Trinidad and Tobago cricketers
Marylebone Cricket Club cricketers
Free Foresters cricketers
H. D. G. Leveson Gower's XI cricketers
British Army personnel of the Second Boer War
Queen's Royal Regiment officers
Royal Northumberland Fusiliers officers